Robert George Dean (died 1989) was an American author of detective fiction. He also worked as a journalist, and as an ambulance driver during World War II.

The last few books Dean wrote, under the pseudonym George Griswold, are spy novels that still have a certain fan following. A character known as Mr. Groode, a shadowy British spymaster, figures in all four novels, but his prominence in the plot varies widely from book to book.

Works
Tony Hunter series
 Murder Makes a Merry Widow (1938)
 A Murder of Convenience (1938)
 Murder Through the Looking Glass (1940)
 A Murder by Marriage (1940)
 Murder in Mink (1941)
 Layoff (1942)
 On Ice (1942)
 The Body Was Quite Cold (Dutton, 1951)
 The Case of Joshua Locke (Dutton, 1951)
 Affair at Lover's Leap (aka Death at Lover's Leap) (Doubleday’s Crime Club, 1953)

other
 Murder Most Opportune
 Murder on Margin
 Three Lights Went Out
 What Gentleman Strangles a Lady
 The Sutton Place Murders

He also wrote four books under the pseudonym George Griswold:

A Checkmate for the Colonel (1952)
A Gambit for Mr. Groode (1953)
Red Pawns (1954)
The Pinned Man (1954)

Sources 
http://www.thrillingdetective.com/hunter2.html
On Ice (Superior Reprint, 1945)

American crime fiction writers
20th-century American novelists
1989 deaths
American male journalists
Year of birth missing
American male novelists
20th-century American male writers